The Santosham Best Villain Award is given by Santosham Film as part of its annual Santosham Film Awards for Telugu films.

The award was first given in 2003.

References

Santosham Film Awards